Major General Robert Bowles (1744 – 1812) was an officer in the British East India Company Army (Bombay Army) for 35 years. He was commander in chief in Bombay in 1800.

Footnotes

References

Commanders-in-chief of Bombay
British East India Company Army generals
1744 births
1812 deaths